Milan Fukal (born 16 May 1975, in Jablonec nad Nisou) is a Czech former professional footballer.

The defender began his career with FK Jablonec. In 1999, he was bought by the Czech champion team Sparta Prague and called up by the Czech national team, for which he  won 19 caps (two goals).

His participation in Euro 2000 gained the attention of the Bundesliga team Hamburger SV, who took him to Germany. Before the 2004–05 season, he moved to Borussia Mönchengladbach, staying with them until the start of the 2006–07 season. Following a trial week at Leeds United, and an interest in his services from Manchester City, he was ready to move to England. However, neither club followed up their interest and Fukal and Mönchengladbach agreed on a contract cancellation that allowed him to move back home to Jablonec nad Nisou and to sign a deal with his hometown side, FK Jablonec.

2008 Fukal changed to the Austrian first league club Kapfenberger SV. After 3 seasons, Fukal moved in 2011 to FC Hradec Králové, where he played in the Czech First League for two more years. In 2013, Fukal played in Austria for SV Esternberg.

References

External links
 
 
 
 
 

1975 births
Living people
Sportspeople from Jablonec nad Nisou
Association football defenders
Czech footballers
Czech Republic under-21 international footballers
Czech Republic international footballers
AC Sparta Prague players
Bohemians 1905 players
Czech First League players
Hamburger SV players
Borussia Mönchengladbach players
Bundesliga players
Expatriate footballers in Germany
1997 FIFA Confederations Cup players
UEFA Euro 2000 players
FK Jablonec players
FC Hradec Králové players
Kapfenberger SV players
Czech expatriate sportspeople in Germany